Maximilian Heidegger (מקס היידגר; born June 5, 1997) is an American-Israeli professional basketball player for Saski Baskonia of the Spanish Liga ACB and the EuroLeague. He played college basketball for UC Santa Barbara.

High school career
Heidegger played for two years at Crespi Carmelite High School. He suffered a back injury as a sophomore. As a junior, he transferred to Blair Academy in New Jersey but did not play basketball. Heidegger transferred to Oaks Christian School for his senior year. He scored a career-high 40 points on February 6, 2016, in a 76–66 win against Agoura High School. Heidegger averaged 28 points, 5.9 rebounds, 2.9 assists, and 1.4 steals per game. He was named to the Southern Section All-Division 4A Team, Los Angeles Daily News All-Area Team, and Ventura County Star All-County Team.

College career
As a freshman at UC Santa Barbara, Heidegger averaged 7.6 points, 2.1 rebounds, and 1.4 assists per game, though the team struggled to a 6–22 record. On November 11, 2017, Heidegger scored a career-high 33 points while shooting 8-of-14 from beyond the arc in an 85–66 win against North Dakota State. He averaged 19.1 points, 2.5 rebounds, and 2.5 assists per game as a sophomore, shooting 40.4% from three-point range. Heidegger earned First Team All-Big West honors. He averaged 11.9 points, three rebounds, and 2.7 assists per game as a junior.

On November 27, 2019, Heidegger suffered a concussion after hitting his head on a metal railing during a game against Portland State, forcing him to miss more than a month. On February 1, 2020, he nearly posted a triple-double with 14 points, 11 assists, and nine rebounds in an 87–62 win against Long Beach State. Heidegger had a season-high 31 points on February 13, in an 84–75 loss at UC Davis. He suffered a season-ending ankle injury on February 27 against UC Riverside. As a senior, Heidegger led UC Santa Barbara in scoring at 16 points per game, and also averaged 3.2 assists and 2.4 rebounds per game. He was named to the First Team All-Big West. Heidegger finished his college career with 1,347 points, ranking 15th on the Gauchos' all-time scoring list.

Professional career

Maccabi Tel Aviv / Bnei Herzliya (2020–2021)
On September 22, 2020, Heidegger signed his first professional contract with Maccabi Tel Aviv of the Israeli Premier League. On December 5, 2020, Heidegger was loaned to Bnei Herzliya of the Israeli Premier League. He averaged 18.2 points, 2.0 rebounds, and 2.6 assists per game.

EWE Baskets (2021–2022)
On July 9, 2021, Heidegger signed with EWE Baskets Oldenburg of the German Basketball Bundesliga. In 26 German league games played, he averaged 18.3 points, 2.2 rebounds and 4.5 assists per game.

He played for the Atlanta Hawks in the 2021 NBA summer league, scoring 12 points in 15 minutes on 4–8 shooting at his debut in a 85–83 loss against the Boston Celtics and fellow Israeli Yam Madar.

Merkezefendi Bld. Denizli Basket (2022–2023)
On August 1, 2022, Heidegger signed with Merkezefendi Bld. Denizli Basket of the Turkish Basketball Super League (BSL). He averaged 19.5 points, 2.9 rebounds and 6.3 assists in 15 BSL games played.

Baskonia (2023–present)
On January 28, 2023, Heidegger signed with Saski Baskonia of the Liga ACB and the EuroLeague.

Personal life
Heidegger is the son of Jami and Klaus Heidegger. His father is an Austrian former alpine skier who finished second overall at the 1976–77 FIS Alpine Ski World Cup. He later became a successful entrepreneur in the United States. Heidegger's parents owned the beauty brand Kiehl's before selling it to L'Oréal for an estimated $100 million to $150 million in 2000. His mother has a lung disease. Heidegger is Jewish.

References

External links
UC Santa Barbara Gauchos bio

1997 births
Living people
American men's basketball players
American expatriate basketball people in Germany
American expatriate basketball people in Israel
American expatriate basketball people in Spain
Basketball players from Los Angeles
Blair Academy alumni
Bnei Hertzeliya basketball players
EWE Baskets Oldenburg players
Maccabi Tel Aviv B.C. players
Merkezefendi Belediyesi Denizli Basket players
Point guards
Riesen Ludwigsburg players
Saski Baskonia players
UC Santa Barbara Gauchos men's basketball players